Back in Brown is the second studio album by New Zealand band Deja Voodoo that was released in 2006. It reached number 20 on the New Zealand album chart.

Track listing 
 "Team Police"
 "Can't Do (What I Wanna Do)"
 "Shotgun"
 "Auckland Girls" (feat. Foamy Ed)
 "Weed On"
 "Frat Nation"
 "Light The Fuse"
 "Tracy"
 "Society (Why Me)?"
 "History Never Deletes"
 "Noise Control"

References 

Deja Voodoo (New Zealand band) albums
2006 albums